The 1989 Trofeo Hermanos Rodríguez was the eighth and final round of the 1989 World Sportscar Championship season. It took place at the Autódromo Hermanos Rodríguez, Mexico on October 29, 1989.

During qualifying, Patrick Tambay's Jaguar came in contact with Antoine Salamin's Porsche on the front stretch, causing the Porsche to make heavy contact with the pit wall. Tambay was fined US$15,000 for the incident. Along with Salamin, several other teams were unable to race due to damage incurred during practice and qualifying.

Sauber Mercedes teammates Mauro Baldi and Jean-Louis Schlesser were both in contention going into this final round, Baldi leading by seven points.  However, spin at Turn 14 by Kenny Acheson eliminated co-driver Baldi from contention, allowing Schlesser to take the World Drivers Championship.

Official results
Class winners in bold. Cars failing to complete 75% of winner's distance marked as Not Classified (NC).

Statistics
 Pole position - #61 Team Sauber Mercedes - 1:22.571
 Fastest lap - #62 Team Sauber Mercedes - 1:25.120
 Average speed - 168.788 km/h

References

 

Mexico
Mexico City
6 Hours of Mexico